Oglaza or Ogłaza is a surname. Notable people with this surname include:

 Aleksandra Ogłaza, Polish beauty pageant contestant
 Glen Oglaza (born 1955), British journalist
  (born 1979), Polish politician

See also
 

Polish-language surnames